Dünsener Bach (in its lower course: Pultern) is a river of Lower Saxony, Germany. It flows into the Varreler Bäke east of Delmenhorst.

See also
List of rivers of Lower Saxony

References

Rivers of Lower Saxony
Rivers of Germany